Arabkhaneh Rural District is a rural district (dehestan) in Shusef District, Nehbandan County, South Khorasan Province, Iran. At the 2006 census, its population was 5,738, in 1,619 families.  The rural district has 84 villages. It is one of the few districts of Iran that has Arabic as a first language. While Iranians have Arabic as a religious second language, Arabkhaneh uses Arabic as a first language.

References 

Rural Districts of South Khorasan Province
Nehbandan County